The Art of Storytelling is the fourth and most recent studio album by British-American rapper Slick Rick. Originally scheduled for a February 1999 release, it was ultimately released May 25, 1999, on Def Jam Recordings. The album features production from DJ Clark Kent and Kid Capri, among others. Upon its release, The Art of Storytelling proved to be Slick Rick's highest-charting album, peaking at number eight on the Billboard 200, and number one on the Top R&B/Hip-Hop Albums, and was certified gold by the RIAA within a month of its release.

Track listing
Credits adapted from the album's liner notes.

Sample credits
 "King Piece In The Chess Game" contains a sample from "Sad Feeling", written by Deadric Malone, and performed by Bobby Bland.
 "Trapped In Me" contains a sample from "Tin Tin Deo", written by Chano Pozo, and performed by Buddy Montgomery.
 "I Run This" contains samples from:
 "Children's Story", written and performed by Slick Rick.
 "Jam Master Jay", written by Darryl McDaniels, Jason Mizell, Joseph Simmons, and Russell Simmons, and performed by Run-DMC.
 "The Show" and "La Di Da Di", written and performed by Doug E. Fresh and Slick Rick.
 "Body and Soul", written by Frank Eyton, Johnny Green, Edward Heyman, and Robert Sour, and performed by Sonny Rollins.
 "Frozen" contains:
 an interpolation from "Make It Last All Night", written by Bill Conti, Shelby Conti, and Chris West.
 a sample from "Seven Months", written by Geoff Barrow, Beth Gibbons, and Adrian Utley, and performed by Portishead.
 "Why, Why, Why" contains a sample from "Funky President (People It's Bad)", written and performed by James Brown.
 "Memories" contains a sample from "The Best Girls Don't Always Win", written by Clarence Reid, and performed by Betty Wright.
 "Unify" contains a sample from "One Mint Julep", written by Rudy Toombs.
 "I Own America Part 2" contains a sample from "I Can't Go On Living Without You", written by Benjamin Wright, and performed by Tavares.
 "We Turn It On" contains a sample of "The Show" written and performed by Doug E. Fresh and Slick Rick.

Charts

Weekly charts

Year-end charts

Certifications

See also
 List of number-one R&B albums of 1999 (U.S.)

References

External links
 The Art of Storytelling at Discogs
 Album review at RapReviews.com

1999 albums
Slick Rick albums
Def Jam Recordings albums
Albums produced by Rashad Smith
Albums produced by Clark Kent (producer)
Albums produced by Ty Fyffe
Albums produced by Jazze Pha